Anita Farra (15 July 1905 – 4 August 2008) was an Italian stage and film actress. She appeared in around forty films during her career, generally in small or supporting roles such as that in The Siege of the Alcazar (1940). Farra was also a noted voice actor, dubbing foreign films for release in Italy. She made a number of films in Spain.

Selected filmography
 The Knight of San Marco (1939)
 The Faceless Voice (1939)
 The Siege of the Alcazar (1940)
 Pirates of Malaya (1941)
The King of England Will Not Pay (1941)
 A Woman Has Fallen (1941)
 The Black Siren (1947)

References

Bibliography 
 Cardullo, Bert. André Bazin and Italian Neorealism. A&C Black, 2011.

External links 
 

1905 births
2008 deaths
Italian film actresses
Italian stage actresses
20th-century Italian actresses
Actors from Venice
Italian centenarians
Women centenarians